Yu Le (Chinese: 于乐; born 26 February 1985, in Beijing) is a Chinese football player.

Club career
In 2006, Yu Le started his professional footballer career with Henan Jianye in the China League One. He would eventually make his league debut for Henan on 29 April 2007 in a game against Dalian Shide, coming on as a substitute for Arthur Gómez in the 46th minute.

In February 2012, Yu transferred to China League One side Shenzhen Ruby.

Career statistics
Statistics accurate as of match played 28 October 2017

Honours
Henan Jianye
China League One: 2006

References

1985 births
Living people
Chinese footballers
Footballers from Beijing
Henan Songshan Longmen F.C. players
Shenzhen F.C. players
Chinese Super League players
China League One players
Association football forwards